The Church of the Eremitani (Italian: Chiesa degli Eremitani), or Church of the Hermits, is a former-Augustinian, 13th-century Gothic-style church in Padua, region of the Veneto, Italy. It is also now notable for being adjacent to the Cappella Scrovegni with Giotto frescoes and the municipal archeology and art gallery: the Musei Civici agli Eremitani, which is housed in the former Augustinian monastery located to the left of the entrance.

History
The Augustinian hermit friars, precursors of the present Order of Saint Augustine had arrived in Padua in 1237. Through the patronage of both the wife of the local nobleman Zaccaria dell'Arena and the city, the church was erected between 1260 and 1276 and dedicated to the saints Philip and James. The friars would remain in the administration of the monastery and church until 1806, when the Napoleonic rule suppressed the order and closed the monastery. The church was re-opened to services in 1808, and in 1817 reformulated into a parish church.

The facade is tall with a rose window. A 15th-century side portal has bas-reliefs depicting the months, completed by  Nicolò Baroncelli. The interior has a single nave.

The church no longer houses the famed Ovetari Chapel frescoes, depicting scenes from the lives of Saints James and Christopher, painted 1448-1457 by the Renaissance painter Mantegna. The chapel was largely destroyed by a March 1944 aerial bombardment by the Allies in World War II, because it was next to a German headquarters.  There are more than 88,000 fragments covering only 77 m2, while the original area covered several hundreds.

The church still preserves frescoes from other painters including Guariento and Ansuino da Forlì. The church contains the tombs of Jacopo II da Carrara (d.1351) and Ubertino da Carrara (d.1345) da Carrara, lords of Padua, both by Andriolo de Santi (de Sanctis) and others.  They were formerly in the church of Sant'Agostino, but were moved here after that church was razed in 1819.

Gallery

References

External links

Churches completed in 1276
Eremitani
Augustinian churches in Italy
Gothic architecture in Padua
13th-century Roman Catholic church buildings in Italy